This is a list of series released by or aired on TVB Jade Channel in 1988.

First line series
These dramas aired in Hong Kong from 7:10pm to 8:10pm, Monday to Friday on TVB.

Second line series
These dramas aired in Hong Kong from 8:10pm to 8:40pm, Monday to Friday on TVB.

Third line series
These dramas aired in Hong Kong from 8:50pm to 9:50pm, Monday to Friday on TVB.

Other series

Warehoused series
These dramas were released overseas and have not broadcast on TVB Jade Channel.

External links
TVB.com Official Website 

TVB dramas